Queer media and entertainment may refer to:

List of LGBT periodicals
List of LGBT-related films